Evangel Hospital is a non-profit Christian Community Hospital in Ma  Tau Wai was established in 1965. It was founded by Evangelical Free Church of America and the Evangelical Free Church of China.  

Evangel Hospital is particularly strong in the primary care field of medicine.  

The hospital is a member of the Hong Kong Private Hospitals Association (PHA), and is surveyed bi-annually by QHA Trent Accreditation, a UK-based major international healthcare accreditation scheme.

Location
Evangel Hospital is located in Kowloon, at 222 Argyle Street. It is in close proximity to another private hospital, St. Teresa's Hospital, in Ma Tau Wai, as well as the public housing estate Ma Tau Wai Estate.

See also 
List of hospitals in Hong Kong
Health in Hong Kong

Footnotes

References

External links
 

Hospital buildings completed in 1965
Hospitals in Hong Kong
Medical Services by Protestant Churches in Hong Kong
Evangelical Free Church of America
Hospitals established in 1965
Hospitals in Kowloon City District
Evangelical Free Church of China